Sambas may refer to:

Sambas Regency, a regency in West Kalimantan
Sambas (town), a town in West Kalimantan
Sultanate of Sambas, a Malay sultanate in West Kalimantan
Plural of samba, a Brazilian music and dance style